Eastern Bus, also known as Eastern Shuttle and formerly Eastern Travel, was a provider of intercity bus service along the Interstate 95 corridor between New York City and Richmond, Virginia. It is one of several Chinatown bus lines and is now the operator of buses along the East Coast of the United States for Flixbus. All buses feature the Flixbus green and yellow livery, with a notation near the door that the buses are operated by Eastern.

The company was one of the first New York-Washington buses to go uptown.

History
The company was founded by Zheng Shui Ming in 2002. Zheng immigrated from Fujian Province in southern China in 1991 on a fishing vessel. He then bought a secondhand minibus from a friend in Queens and started driving. The company attracted cooks and dishwashers with jobs in Chinese restaurants as well as college students.

Following a requirement for all intercity services in Boston to move into the South Station terminal, Eastern left the Boston market and competed in the New York City-Washington, D.C. market.

Eastern brought in David Wong, Chinese-born but educated in the United States with a Master of Business Administration, as a part-owner and manager of its operations. Wong added a stop near Pennsylvania Station in New York.

In 2006, the company estimated $3 million in sales.

In May 2008, the company added Wi-Fi to its 12 buses.

In fall 2008, Coach USA acquired Eastern. In winter 2009, Coach USA purchased Today's and merged it into Eastern.

In August 2009, Megabus divested itself of Eastern Shuttle.

In May 2019, the company reached a deal with Flixbus, in which Flixbus handles all marketing and sales for the company.

Stop locations

References

External links

Chinatown bus lines
Transport companies established in 2003
Intercity bus companies of the United States
Companies based in New York City
Transportation companies based in New York City